Henri Naisseline (born 21 May 1911 - 1973 ) was a New Caledonian politician.  He served for some time as chief of the Guhama region on the island of Maré.  His son, Nidoïsh, succeeded him as chief before going on to a career in island politics.

References

1911 births
Kanak chiefs
1973 deaths
People from the Loyalty Islands